Shibee is a village in Kyrgyzstan in the Vakhsh valley near the border with Tajikistan. It is part of the Chong-Alay District. Its population was 1,073 in 2021.

References

Populated places in Osh Region